The chemical compound 1,2-dioxetanedione, or 1,2-dioxacyclobutane-3,4-dione, often called peroxyacid ester, is an unstable oxide of carbon (an oxocarbon) with formula CO. It can be viewed as a double ketone of 1,2-dioxetane (1,2-dioxacyclobutane), or a cyclic dimer of carbon dioxide.

1,2-Dioxetanedione is an intermediate in the chemoluminescent reactions used in glowsticks. The decomposition proceeds via a paramagnetic oxalate biradical intermediate.

Recently it has been found that a high-energy intermediate in one of these reactions (between oxalyl chloride and hydrogen peroxide in ethyl acetate), which is presumed to be 1,2-dioxetanedione, can accumulate in solution at room temperature  (up to a few micromoles at least), provided that the activating dye and all traces of metals and other reducing agents are removed from the system, and the reactions are carried out in an inert atmosphere.

See also
 1,3-dioxetanedione

References

External links

Oxocarbons
Lactones
Dioxetanes
Organic peroxides
Chemiluminescence
Conjugated ketones